Rodolpho Barteczko (12 November 1910 – 13 March 1988), best known as Patesko, was a Brazilian footballer who played striker. He was born in Curitiba, Brazil and died in Rio de Janeiro.

Of Polish origin, in his career (1930–1943) he played for Palestra Itália, Força e Luz, Nacional (where he won the Uruguayan championships of 1933) and Botafogo. He won the Rio de Janeiro State Tournament in 1935.

For the Brazilian team he participated at the 1934 and 1938 World Cups. He died at 77 years old.

References and footnotes

1910 births
1988 deaths
Brazilian footballers
Brazilian expatriate footballers
Brazil international footballers
Association football forwards
Club Nacional de Football players
Botafogo de Futebol e Regatas players
Expatriate footballers in Uruguay
Brazilian expatriate sportspeople in Uruguay
1934 FIFA World Cup players
1938 FIFA World Cup players
Brazilian people of Polish descent
Footballers from Curitiba